The 2022 Munster Senior Camogie Championship was run as a standalone competition in May 2022. It was not part of the 2022 All-Ireland Senior Camogie Championship. Cork were the defending champions. Cork beat Clare in the final. Cork's intermediate team beat Kerry in the Intermediate final. Clare beat Waterford in the Munster junior final.

Teams

5 teams took part in a knock-out competition.

 Clare
 Cork
 Limerick
 Tipperary
 Waterford

Knockout stage

Quarter-final

Semi-finals

Final

References 

2022 in camogie